Iselín Santos Ovejero Maya (born 16 October 1945) is a retired Argentinian footballer.

Career
Ovejero began his career with Club Atlético Vélez Sarsfield, where he would win the 1968 Argentine first division. He played for Atlético Madrid between 1969 and 1974, winning the Spanish La Liga in 1970 and 1973, and the Copa del Rey in 1972. He also played for the Argentina national football team in the 1967 South American Championship.

As a coach, he also managed Atlético Madrid for 7 games between 1990 and 1991. Under his management, Atletico Madrid won 1991 Copa del Rey.

Honours
Player
 Atlético Madrid
Copa del Generalísimo: 1971-72
Spanish League: 1969-70, 1972-73

Manager
 Atlético Madrid
Copa del Rey: 1990-91

References

External links

1945 births
Living people
Argentine footballers
Argentina international footballers
1967 South American Championship players
Argentine football managers
Club Atlético Vélez Sarsfield footballers
Atlético Madrid footballers
Real Zaragoza players
Terrassa FC footballers
UE Sant Andreu footballers
Argentine Primera División players
La Liga players
Atlético Madrid B managers
Atlético Madrid managers
Association football defenders
Argentine expatriate footballers
Expatriate footballers in Spain
Sportspeople from Mendoza, Argentina